, the World Checklist of Selected Plant Families accepted about 1000 species, with a further 1200-odd synonyms. The accepted names are listed below.

A-E

A

 Phyllanthus abditus G.L.Webster – S.W. Haiti (Massif de la Hotte)
 Phyllanthus abnormis Baill. – Florida, S. Central U.S. to N.E. Mexico — Drummond's leafflower
 Phyllanthus acacioides Urb. – Tobago
 Phyllanthus acidus (L.) Skeels – Brazil (Pará) – country gooseberry, gooseberry tree, Malay gooseberry, Otaheite gooseberry or Tahitian gooseberry tree
 Phyllanthus acinacifolius Airy Shaw & G.L.Webster – N.E. Papua New Guinea
 Phyllanthus actephilifolius J.J.Sm. – W. New Guinea
 Phyllanthus acuminatus Vahl – Caribbean, Mexico to N.W. Argentina – Jamaican gooseberry tree
 Phyllanthus acutifolius Poir. ex Spreng. – S.E. Brazil
 Phyllanthus acutissimus Miq. – S. Myanmar to W. Malesia
 Phyllanthus adenodiscus Müll.Arg. – Mexico
 Phyllanthus adianthoides Klotzsch – Guyana to Suriname
 Phyllanthus aeneus Baill. – New Caledonia
 Phyllanthus affinis Müll.Arg. – Sri Lanka
 Phyllanthus ajmerianus L.B.Chaudhary & R.R.Rao – India (Rajasthan)
 Phyllanthus albidiscus (Ridl.) Airy Shaw – Peninsula Thailand to Pen. Malaysia, Jawa
 Phyllanthus albizzioides (Kurz) Hook.f. – Myanmar
 Phyllanthus albus (Blanco) Müll.Arg. – Philippines, Sulawesi
 Phyllanthus allemii G.L.Webster – Brazil (Goiás)
 Phyllanthus almadensis Müll.Arg. – Brazil (S.E. Bahia)
 Phyllanthus alpestris Beille – W. Tropical Africa
 Phyllanthus amarus Schumach. & Thonn. – Tropical & Subtrop. America
 Phyllanthus ambatovolanus Leandri – CE. Madagascar
 Phyllanthus amentuliger Müll.Arg. – Fiji (E. Viti Levu, Vanua Levu)
 Phyllanthus amicorum G.L.Webster – Tonga
 Phyllanthus amieuensis Guillaumin – New Caledonia (Col d'Amieu)
 Phyllanthus amnicola G.L.Webster – Dominican Rep
 Phyllanthus ampandrandavae Leandri – S. Madagascar
 Phyllanthus anabaptizatus Müll.Arg. – Sri Lanka
 Phyllanthus analamerae Leandri – W. Madagascar (Diego-Suarez)
 Phyllanthus anamalayanus (Gamble) G.L.Webster – S. India (Anamalai Hills)
 Phyllanthus andamanicobaricus Chakrab. & N.P.Balakr. – Andaman & Nicobar Islands, Myanmar
 Phyllanthus andamanicus N.P.Balakr. & N.G.Nair – N. Andaman Islands
 Phyllanthus anderssonii Müll.Arg. – Windward Islands
 Phyllanthus andranovatensis Jean F.Brunel & J.P.Roux – S.E. Madagascar
 Phyllanthus anfractuosus (Gibbs) W.L.Wagner & Lorence – Fiji (Viti Levu, Ovalau)
 Phyllanthus angkorensis Beille – E. Thailand to Cambodia
 Phyllanthus angolensis Müll.Arg. – Malawi, Zambia, Angola
 Phyllanthus angustatus Hutch. – Zambia
 Phyllanthus angustifolius (Sw.) Sw. – Caribbean
 Phyllanthus angustissimus Müll.Arg. – Brazil (Bahia to Rio Grande do Sul)
 Phyllanthus anisolobus Müll.Arg. – Nicaragua to W. Ecuador
 Phyllanthus anisophyllioides Merr. – Philippines
 Phyllanthus ankarana Leandri – N. & W. Madagascar
 Phyllanthus ankaratrae (Leandri) Petra Hoffm. & McPherson – Central Madagascar (Ambositra)
 Phyllanthus ankazobensis Ralim. & Petra Hoffm. – Madagascar
 Phyllanthus anthopotamicus Hand.-Mazz. – S. China
 Phyllanthus aoraiensis Nadeaud – Society Islands
 Phyllanthus aoupinieensis M.Schmid – New Caledonia (Massif de l'Aoupinié)
 Phyllanthus aphanostylus Airy Shaw & G.L.Webster – New Guinea (incl. D'Entrecasteaux Islands)
 Phyllanthus apiculatus Merr. – Philippines
 Phyllanthus aracaensis G.L.Webster ex Secco & A.Rosário – Brazil (Amazonas, Roraima)
 Phyllanthus arachnodes Govaerts & Radcl.-Sm. – Cambodia
 Phyllanthus arbuscula (Sw.) J.F.Gmel. – Jamaica
 Phyllanthus archboldianus Airy Shaw & G.L.Webster – New Guinea
 Phyllanthus ardisianthus Airy Shaw & G.L.Webster – W. New Guinea
 Phyllanthus arenarius Beille – Vietnam, S. China
 Phyllanthus arenicola Casar. – S.E. Brazil
 Phyllanthus argyi H.Lév. – S. China
 Phyllanthus aridus Benth. – N. Western Australia, Northern Territory
 Phyllanthus armstrongii Benth. – Northern Territory
 Phyllanthus artensis M.Schmid – New Caledonia (N. Ile Art)
 Phyllanthus arvensis Müll.Arg. – DR Congo to S. Africa
 Phyllanthus aspersus Jean F.Brunel & J.P.Roux – Cameroon
 Phyllanthus asperulatus Hutch. – Northern Province, Botswana, Mozamboque, Zimbabwe
 Phyllanthus assamicus Müll.Arg. – India to Taiwan
 Phyllanthus atabapoensis Jabl. – Colombia to N. Brazil
 Phyllanthus atalaiensis G.L.Webster – Brazil (Goiás)
 Phyllanthus atalotrichus (A.C.Sm.) W.L.Wagner & Lorence – Fiji (Viti Levu)
 Phyllanthus atrovirens (A.C.Sm.) W.L.Wagner & Lorence – Fiji (S. Viti Levu)
 Phyllanthus attenuatus Miq. – S. Tropical America
 Phyllanthus augustini Baill. – Brazil (Espírito Santo, Rio de Janeiro)
 Phyllanthus australis Hook.f. – S. & E. Australia, Tasmania
 Phyllanthus austroparensis Radcl.-Sm. – Tanzania
 Phyllanthus avanguiensis M.Schmid – New Caledonia (Mt. Boulinda)
 Phyllanthus avicularis Müll.Arg. – Brazil (Minas Gerais, São Paulo)
 Phyllanthus awaensis G.L.Webster – Ecuador (Carchi)
 Phyllanthus axillaris (Sw.) Müll.Arg. – W. Jamaica

B

 Phyllanthus baeckeoides J.T.Hunter & J.J.Bruhl – Western Australia (near Laverton)
 Phyllanthus baeobotryoides Wall. ex Müll.Arg. – Assam to Myanmar
 Phyllanthus bahiensis Müll.Arg. – N.E. Brazil
 Phyllanthus baillonianus Müll.Arg. – S.W. India, Sri Lanka
 Phyllanthus baladensis Baill. – N.W. & Central New Caledonia
 Phyllanthus balakrishnanii Sunil, K.M.P.Kumar & Naveen Kum. – India (Kerala)
 Phyllanthus balansae Beille – Vietnam
 Phyllanthus balansanus Guillaumin – S.W. New Caledonia
 Phyllanthus balgooyi Petra Hoffm. & A.J.M.Baker – Borneo (Sabah) to Philippines
 Phyllanthus bancilhonae Jean F.Brunel & J.P.Roux – W. Tropical Africa
 Phyllanthus baraouaensis M.Schmid – New Caledonia (W. Mé Maoya)
 Phyllanthus barbarae M.C.Johnst. – N.E. Mexico
 Phyllanthus bathianus Leandri – Central Madagascar
 Phyllanthus beddomei (Gamble) M.Mohanan – S.W. India
 Phyllanthus bemangidiensis Ralim. – Madagascar
 Phyllanthus benguelensis Müll.Arg. – Angola
 Phyllanthus benguetensis C.B.Rob. – Philippines
 Phyllanthus bequaertii Robyns & Lawalrée – W. Central & E. Tropical Africa
 Phyllanthus bernardii Jabl. – Venezuela (Mérida)
 Phyllanthus bernierianus Baill. ex Müll.Arg. – Mozambique, Madagascar
 Phyllanthus berteroanus Müll.Arg. – N. Hispaniola
 Phyllanthus betsileanus Leandri – Madagascar
 Phyllanthus biantherifer Croizat – Brazil (Amazonas: Humayta)
 Phyllanthus bicolor Vis. – Venezuela
 Phyllanthus billardierei (Baill.) Müll.Arg. – New Caledonia (incl. îs. Loyauté)
 Phyllanthus binhii Thin – Vietnam
 Phyllanthus birmanicus Müll.Arg. – Myanmar
 Phyllanthus blanchetianus Müll.Arg. – Brazil (Bahia)
 Phyllanthus blancoanus Müll.Arg. – Philippines
 Phyllanthus bodinieri (H.Lév.) Rehder – China (S.E. Guangxi, SE. Guizhou)
 Phyllanthus boehmii Pax – Ethiopia to S. Tropical Africa
 Phyllanthus boguenensis M.Schmid – Central New Caledonia
 Phyllanthus bojerianus (Baill.) Müll.Arg. – Madagascar
 Phyllanthus bokorensis Tagane – S. Cambodia
 Phyllanthus bolivarensis Steyerm. – Venezuela (Bolívar)
 Phyllanthus bolivianus Pax & K.Hoffm. – Bolivia
 Phyllanthus bonnardii Jean F.Brunel – Ivory Coast
 Phyllanthus borenensis M.G.Gilbert – Ethiopia (Sidamo)
 Phyllanthus borjaensis Jabl. – Colombia to S. Venezuela
 Phyllanthus borneensis Müll.Arg. – W. Malesia
 Phyllanthus botryanthus Müll.Arg. – S.W. Mexico, Colombia, Venezuela, Aruba, Curaçao, Bonaire
 Phyllanthus bourdillonii (Gamble) Chakrab. & N.P.Balakr. – Bhutan, S. India
 Phyllanthus bourgeoisii Baill. – New Guinea to N.W. & S. Central New Caledonia
 Phyllanthus brachyphyllus Urb. – Haiti
 Phyllanthus bracteatus (Gillespie) W.L.Wagner & Lorence – Fiji (Viti Levu)
 Phyllanthus brandegeei Millsp. – Mexico (Baja California Sur)
 Phyllanthus brasiliensis (Aubl.) Poir. – Lesser Antilles to S. Tropical America
 Phyllanthus brassii C.T.White – Queensland (Thornton Peak)
 Phyllanthus brevipes Hook.f. – Arunachal Pradesh (Mishmi Hills)
 Phyllanthus breynioides (P.T.Li) Govaerts & Radcl.-Sm. – China (Guangxi)
 Phyllanthus brothersonii (J.Florence) W.L.Wagner & Lorence – Society Islands
 Phyllanthus brunnescens (A.C.Sm.) W.L.Wagner & Lorence – Fiji
 Phyllanthus brynaertii Jean F.Brunel – DR Congo
 Phyllanthus buchii Urb. – Hispaniola
 Phyllanthus bupleuroides Baill. – New Caledonia
 Phyllanthus burundiensis Jean F.Brunel – Burundi
 Phyllanthus buxifolius (Blume) Müll.Arg. – Jawa to Lesser Sunda Islands
 Phyllanthus buxoides Guillaumin – N.W. New Caledonia

C

 Phyllanthus cacuminum Müll.Arg. – Jawa
 Phyllanthus caesiifolius Petra Hoffm. & Cheek – Cameroon
 Phyllanthus caesius Airy Shaw & G.L.Webster – New Guinea
 Phyllanthus caespitosus Brenan – Malawi, Zambia
 Phyllanthus calcicola M.Schmid – N.W. New Caledonia
 Phyllanthus calciphilus (Croizat) W.L.Wagner & Lorence – Fiji (Fulanga, Kambara)
 Phyllanthus caledonicus (Müll.Arg.) Müll.Arg. – New Caledonia (incl. î. des Pins, îs. Loyauté)
 Phyllanthus caligatus Jean F.Brunel & J.P.Roux – Cameroon
 Phyllanthus callejasii G.L.Webster – Colombia
 Phyllanthus calocarpus (Kurz) Chakrab. & N.P.Balakr. – Andaman and Nicobar Islands
 Phyllanthus calycinus Labill. – S.E. Sulawesi, Western Australia, South Australia
 Phyllanthus camerunensis Jean F.Brunel – Cameroon
 Phyllanthus candolleanus (Wight & Arn.) Chakrab. & N.P.Balakr. – S.W. India, Sri Lanka
 Phyllanthus caparaoensis G.L.Webster – S.E. Brazil
 Phyllanthus caraculiensis Jean F.Brunel – Angola
 Phyllanthus caribaeus Urb. – S. Mexico to S. Tropical America and Windward Islands
 Phyllanthus carinatus Beille – Vietnam
 Phyllanthus carlottae M.Schmid – S.E. New Caledonia
 Phyllanthus carnosulus Müll.Arg. – S.E. Cuba
 Phyllanthus caroliniensis Walter – Central & E. U.S. to N.E. Argentina – Carolina leafflower
 Phyllanthus carpentariae Müll.Arg. – Northern Territory, Queensland, New South Wales
 Phyllanthus carrenoi Steyerm. – Venezuela (Bolívar: Cerro Jaua)
 Phyllanthus carunculatus Jean F.Brunel – DR Congo
 Phyllanthus carvalhoi G.L.Webster – Brazil (S.E. Bahia)
 Phyllanthus casearioides S.Moore – New Caledonia (Touho Reg.)
 Phyllanthus cassioides Rusby – Bolivia
 Phyllanthus casticum P.Willemet – W. Indian Ocean
 Phyllanthus castus S.Moore – S.E. New Caledonia
 Phyllanthus caudatifolius Merr. – Philippines
 Phyllanthus caudatus Müll.Arg. – S.E. New Caledonia
 Phyllanthus cauliflorus (Sw.) Griseb. – W. Jamaica
 Phyllanthus cauticola J.T.Hunter & J.J.Bruhl – Northern Territory
 Phyllanthus caymanensis G.L.Webster & Proctor – Cayman Islands
 Phyllanthus cedrelifolius Verdc. – KwaZulu-Natal, Cape Province
 Phyllanthus celastroides Müll.Arg. – Borneo (S.E. Kalimantan), Sumatera (Bangka, Billiton)
 Phyllanthus celebicus Koord. – Sulawesi
 Phyllanthus ceratostemon Brenan – W. Central Tropical Africa to Chad, Zambia
 Phyllanthus chacoensis Morong – Brazil to Bolivia and N.E. Argentina
 Phyllanthus chamaecerasus Baill. – New Caledonia
 Phyllanthus chamaecristoides Urb. – Cuba
 Phyllanthus chamaepeuce Ridl. – S. Indo-China to Philippines
 Phyllanthus chandrabosei Govaerts & Radcl.-Sm. – India (Tamil Nadu)
 Phyllanthus chantrieri André – Vietnam
 Phyllanthus chayamaritiae Chantar. & Kantachot – Thailand
 Phyllanthus chekiangensis Croizat & Metcalf – S.E. China
 Phyllanthus cherrieri M.Schmid – New Caledonia (Mt. Arago)
 Phyllanthus chevalieri Beille – Chad to W. Ethiopia and Tanzania
 Phyllanthus chiapensis Sprague – Mexico (Chiapas: Cacote)
 Phyllanthus chimantae Jabl. – Venezuela (Bolívar: Macizo del Chimantá)
 Phyllanthus choretroides Müll.Arg. – Brazil (Bahia, Minas Gerais)
 Phyllanthus christophersenii (Croizat) W.L.Wagner & Lorence – Samoa
 Phyllanthus chrysanthus Baill. – New Caledonia
 Phyllanthus chryseus Howard – E. Cuba (Sierra de Moa)
 Phyllanthus ciccoides Müll.Arg. – Papua New Guinea to Vanuatu
 Phyllanthus ciliaris Baill. – New Caledonia (near Balade)
 Phyllanthus cinctus Urb. – E. Cuba
 Phyllanthus cinereus Müll.Arg. – Sri Lanka
 Phyllanthus cladanthus Müll.Arg. – Central & E. Jamaica
 Phyllanthus cladotrichus Müll.Arg. – S.E. Brazil (to Bahia)
 Phyllanthus clamboides (F.Muell.) Diels – Papuasia to Queensland
 Phyllanthus clarkei Hook.f. – Bhutan to S. China
 Phyllanthus claussenii Müll.Arg. – Brazil
 Phyllanthus cleistanthoides (Fosberg) W.L.Wagner & Lorence – Caroline Islands
 Phyllanthus coalcomanensis Croizat – W. Mexico, Nicaragua
 Phyllanthus coccineus (Banks) Müll.Arg. – Assam to S. China and Indo-China
 Phyllanthus cochinchinensis Spreng. – Assam to Nansei-shoto and Indo-China
 Phyllanthus cocumbiensis Jean F.Brunel – Angola
 Phyllanthus collinsiae Craib – Indo-China, Lesser Sunda Islands
 Phyllanthus collinus Domin – Queensland
 Phyllanthus columnaris Müll.Arg. – Andaman Islands, Myanmar to N. Peninsula Malaysia
 Phyllanthus coluteoides Baill. ex Müll.Arg. – W. Madagascar, Mozambique Channel Islands
 Phyllanthus comitus (J.Florence) W.L.Wagner & Lorence – Pitcairn Islands
 Phyllanthus comorensis Leandri – Comoros
 Phyllanthus comosus Urb. – N.E. Cuba
 Phyllanthus compressus Kunth – Mexico to Peru
 Phyllanthus comptonii S.Moore – New Caledonia (Ngoye Valley)
 Phyllanthus comptus G.L.Webster – Cuba (Cajalbana Reg.)
 Phyllanthus concolor (Müll.Arg.) Müll.Arg. – Wallis-Futuna Is, Fiji, Tonga, Cook Islands
 Phyllanthus confusus Brenan – Malawi (Mt. Mulanje)
 Phyllanthus conjugatus M.Schmid – New Caledonia
 Phyllanthus consanguineus Müll.Arg. – Réunion
 Phyllanthus coodei Ralim. & Petra Hoffm. – Madagascar
 Phyllanthus cordatulus C.B.Rob. – Philippines
 Phyllanthus cordatus (Seem. ex Müll.Arg.) Müll.Arg. – Fiji
 Phyllanthus coriaceus (Thwaites) Müll.Arg. – Sri Lanka
 Phyllanthus cornutus Baill. – New Caledonia (incl. î. des Pins)
 Phyllanthus coursii Leandri – E. Central Madagascar (near Lac Alaotra)
 Phyllanthus craibii Chakrab. & N.P.Balakr. – E. Myanmar to Cambodia
 Phyllanthus crassinervius Radcl.-Sm. – DR Congo, Tanzania (Mbeya), Malawi, Zambia
 Phyllanthus cristalensis Urb. – E. Cuba (Sierra del Cristal)
 Phyllanthus cryptophilus (Comm. ex A.Juss.) Müll.Arg. – S.E. & ESE. Madagascar
 Phyllanthus cuatrecasanus G.L.Webster – Colombia
 Phyllanthus cuneifolius (Britton) Croizat – Puerto Rico
 Phyllanthus cunenensis Jean F.Brunel – Angola
 Phyllanthus curranii C.B.Rob. – Philippines
 Phyllanthus cuscutiflorus S.Moore – Papua New Guinea to Queensland
 Phyllanthus cuspidatus Müll.Arg. – Samoa
 Phyllanthus cyrtophylloides Müll.Arg. – Jawa
 Phyllanthus cyrtophyllus (Miq.) Müll.Arg. – Sumatera
 Phyllanthus cyrtostylus (Miq.) Müll.Arg. – Jawa to Lesser Sunda Islands

D

 Phyllanthus daclacensis Thin – Vietnam
 Phyllanthus dallachyanus Benth. – N. Australia
 Phyllanthus daltonii Müll.Arg. – Sikkim to S. China and Peninsula Malaysia
 Phyllanthus dasystylus (Kurz) Chakrab. & N.P.Balakr. – China (Yunnan) to Myanmar
 Phyllanthus dawsonii Steyerm. – Brazil (Goiás)
 Phyllanthus dealbatus Alston – Sri Lanka
 Phyllanthus debilis J.G.Klein ex Willd. – Maldives to W. Malesia – lagoon spurge, niruri
 Phyllanthus deciduiramus Däniker – New Caledonia (Mt. Kaala)
 Phyllanthus dekindtianus Jean F.Brunel – Angola
 Phyllanthus delagoensis Hutch. – Gabon to S. Africa
 Phyllanthus denticulatus Jean F.Brunel – Uganda
 Phyllanthus deplanchei Müll.Arg. – New Caledonia (incl. î. des Pins)
 Phyllanthus dewildeanus Jean F.Brunel – Ethiopia
 Phyllanthus dewildeorum M.G.Gilbert – W. Ethiopia
 Phyllanthus dictyophlebsis Radcl.-Sm. – Tanzania
 Phyllanthus dictyospermus Müll.Arg. – Brazil (Minas Gerais, São Paulo)
 Phyllanthus dimorphus Britton & P.Wilson – Cuba (Sierra de Trinidad)
 Phyllanthus dinklagei Pax – W. Central Tropical Africa
 Phyllanthus dinteri Pax – Namibia
 Phyllanthus discolaciniatus Jean F.Brunel – Cameroon
 Phyllanthus discolor Poepp. ex Spreng. – Central & W. Cuba
 Phyllanthus distichus Hook. & Arn. – Hawaiian Islands
 Phyllanthus dongmoensis Thin – Vietnam
 Phyllanthus dorotheae M.Schmid – Central & E. Central New Caledonia
 Phyllanthus dracunculoides Baill. – New Caledonia
 Phyllanthus duidae Gleason – Venezuela (Amazonas: Cerro Duida)
 Phyllanthus dumbeaensis M.Schmid – New Caledonia (Dumbéa-Couvelée)
 Phyllanthus dumetosus Poir. – Rodrigues
 Phyllanthus dumosus C.B.Rob. – Philippines
 Phyllanthus dunnianus (H.Lév.) Hand.-Mazz. ex Rehder – China (Guizhou, Yunnan, Guangxi), Vietnam
 Phyllanthus dusenii Hutch. – Nigeria to Cameroon
 Phyllanthus dzumacensis M.Schmid – New Caledonia (Dzumac Mts.)

E

 Phyllanthus echinospermus C.Wright – W. Cuba
 Phyllanthus edmundoi L.J.M.Santiago – Brazil (Bahia)
 Phyllanthus effusus S.Moore – Papua New Guinea
 Phyllanthus ekmanii G.L.Webster – Cuba (Sierra de Nipe)
 Phyllanthus elegans Wall. ex Müll.Arg. – Indo-China to N. Peninsula Malaysia
 Phyllanthus eliae (Jean F.Brunel & J.P.Roux) Jean F.Brunel – Togo
 Phyllanthus elsiae Urb. – Trinidad-Tobago, Mexico to N. South America
 Phyllanthus emarginatus (J.W.Moore) W.L.Wagner & Lorence – Society Islands
 Phyllanthus embergeri Haicour & Rossignol – Assam to S. China, Taiwan
 Phyllanthus emblica L. – Tropical & Subtrop. Asia – emblic, emblic myrobalan, Indian gooseberry or myrobalan
 Phyllanthus engleri Pax – Tanzania to S. Tropical Africa
 Phyllanthus epiphyllanthus L. – Caribbean
 Phyllanthus epiphylliferens Jean F.Brunel – DR Congo
 Phyllanthus eremicus R.L.Barrett & I.Telford – N. Western Australia
 Phyllanthus ericoides Torr. – Texas (Terrell Co.) to Mexico (Chihuahua)
 Phyllanthus eriocarpus (Champ. ex Benth.) Müll.Arg. – S. China, Taiwan, Indo-China to Malesia
 Phyllanthus erwinii J.T.Hunter & J.J.Bruhl – W. & Central Australia
 Phyllanthus erythrotrichus C.B.Rob. – Philippines
 Phyllanthus eurisladro Mart. ex Colla – Brazil (?)
 Phyllanthus euryoides (A.C.Sm.) W.L.Wagner & Lorence – Fiji (Viti Levu: Mt. Koromba)
 Phyllanthus eutaxioides S.Moore – Queensland (Darwin), Northern Territory (Gove Peninsula)
 Phyllanthus evanescens Brandegee – S. Central Louisiana to Nicaragua
 Phyllanthus everettii C.B.Rob. – Philippines
 Phyllanthus evrardii Beille – Vietnam
 Phyllanthus excisus Urb. – Cuba (Sierra Sagua Baracoa)
 Phyllanthus exilis S.Moore – N. Australia
 Phyllanthus eximius G.L.Webster & Proctor – Jamaica

F-J

F

 Phyllanthus fadyenii Urb. – Jamaica
 Phyllanthus faguetii Baill. – New Caledonia
 Phyllanthus fallax Müll.Arg. – Brazil (Minas Gerais)
 Phyllanthus fangchengensis P.T.Li – China (S.E. Guangxi)
 Phyllanthus fastigiatus Mart. ex Müll.Arg. – Brazil (Minas Gerais, Mato Grosso)
 Phyllanthus favieri M.Schmid – New Caledonia
 Phyllanthus felicis Jean F.Brunel – Guinea
 Phyllanthus ferdinandi Müll.Arg. – Northern Territory, Queensland, New South Wales
 Phyllanthus filicifolius Gage – Peninsula Malaysia (Kedah)
 Phyllanthus fimbriatitepalus Guillaumin – Vanuatu
 Phyllanthus fimbriatus (Wight) Müll.Arg. – S.W. India
 Phyllanthus fimbricalyx P.T.Li – China (S.W. Yunnan)
 Phyllanthus finschii K.Schum. – New Guinea, Bismarck Arch., Tenimbar I
 Phyllanthus fischeri Pax – Eritrea to Tanzania
 Phyllanthus flagellaris Benth. – Northern Territory (Darwin)
 Phyllanthus flagelliformis Müll.Arg. – N.E. Brazil
 Phyllanthus flavidus (Kurz ex Teijsm. & Binn.) Müll.Arg. – Jawa
 Phyllanthus flaviflorus (K.Schum. & Lauterb.) Airy Shaw – Papua New Guinea
 Phyllanthus flexuosus (Siebold & Zucc.) Müll.Arg. – S. China, S. Central & S. Japan
 Phyllanthus florencei W.L.Wagner & Lorence – Society Islands, Tubuai Is
 Phyllanthus fluitans Benth. ex Müll.Arg. – Mexico (Tabasco), S. Tropical America
 Phyllanthus fluminis-athi Radcl.-Sm. – S. Central Kenya
 Phyllanthus fluminis-zambesi Radcl.-Sm. – Zambia
 Phyllanthus formosus Urb. – E. Cuba
 Phyllanthus forrestii W.W.Sm. – S. Central China
 Phyllanthus fotii Jean F.Brunel – Cameroon
 Phyllanthus fractiflexus M.Schmid – New Caledonia (Mt. Koniambo)
 Phyllanthus fraguensis M.C.Johnst. – Mexico
 Phyllanthus franchetianus H.Lév. – China (Guizhou, Sichuan, Yunnan)
 Phyllanthus francii Guillaumin – S. New Caledonia
 Phyllanthus fraternus G.L.Webster – Pakistan to N.W. India – Gulf leafflower
 Phyllanthus frazieri Radcl.-Sm. – Tanzania
 Phyllanthus friesii Hutch. – Tanzania (Iringa), Zambia
 Phyllanthus frodinii Airy Shaw – N.E. Papua New Guinea
 Phyllanthus fuernrohrii F.Muell. – Australia
 Phyllanthus fuertesii Urb. – Hispaniola
 Phyllanthus fulvirameus (Miq.) Müll.Arg. – Jawa, New Guinea (incl. Kep. Aru), Solomon Islands
 Phyllanthus fuscoluridus Müll.Arg. – Madagascar

G

 Phyllanthus gabonensis Jean F.Brunel – Equatorial Guinea to Gabon
 Phyllanthus gageanus (Gamble) M.Mohanan – S.W. India
 Phyllanthus gagnioevae Jean F.Brunel & J.P.Roux – W. & W. Central Tropical Africa
 Phyllanthus galeottianus Baill. – Mexico
 Phyllanthus gaudichaudii Müll.Arg. – Maluku to New Guinea
 Phyllanthus geniculatostemon Jean F.Brunel – Uganda
 Phyllanthus gentryi G.L.Webster – Panama
 Phyllanthus geoffrayi Beille – E. Thailand to Laos
 Phyllanthus gigantifolius Vidal – Philippines
 Phyllanthus gillespiei (Croizat) W.L.Wagner & Lorence – Fiji (Viti Levu)
 Phyllanthus gillettianus Jean F.Brunel – Kenya to Botswana
 Phyllanthus gjellerupi J.J.Sm. – W. New Guinea
 Phyllanthus glabrescens (Miq.) Müll.Arg. – Lesser Sunda Islands
 Phyllanthus gladiatus Müll.Arg. – Brazil (S.E. Bahia to Espírito Santo)
 Phyllanthus glaucinus (Miq.) Müll.Arg. – Sumatera
 Phyllanthus glaucophyllus Sond. – Tropical & S. Africa
 Phyllanthus glaziovii Müll.Arg. – S.E. Brazil (to Paraná)
 Phyllanthus glochidioides Elmer – Philippines
 Phyllanthus glomerulatus (Miq.) Müll.Arg. – India to W. & S. Malesia
 Phyllanthus gneissicus S.Moore – New Caledonia
 Phyllanthus goianensis L.J.M.Santiago – Brazil (Tocantins)
 Phyllanthus golonensis M.Schmid – New Caledonia (Golone)
 Phyllanthus gomphocarpus Hook.f. – Andaman and Nicobar Islands, Myanmar to Jawa
 Phyllanthus gongyloides Cordeiro & Carn.-Torres – Brazil (Bahia)
 Phyllanthus goniostemon Radcl.-Sm. – Uganda
 Phyllanthus gordonii Ralim. & Petra Hoffm. – Madagascar
 Phyllanthus gossweileri Hutch. – Gabon to Zambia
 Phyllanthus goudotianus (Baill.) Müll.Arg. – S.E. Madagascar
 Phyllanthus gracilentus Müll.Arg. – Jawa
 Phyllanthus gracilipes (Miq.) Müll.Arg. – China (W. Guangxi) to W. Malesia
 Phyllanthus gradyi M.J.Silva & M.F.Sales – N.E. Brazil
 Phyllanthus graminicola Hutch. – Zimbabwe to Northern Province
 Phyllanthus grandifolius L. – Mexico to Honduras
 Phyllanthus grantii (J.Florence) W.L.Wagner & Lorence – Society Islands
 Phyllanthus graveolens Kunth – S.W. Mexico, Costa Rica to N. Peru
 Phyllanthus grayanus Müll.Arg. – Society Islands
 Phyllanthus greenei Elmer – Philippines
 Phyllanthus guangdongensis P.T.Li – China (WS.W. Guangdong)
 Phyllanthus guanxiensis Govaerts & Radcl.-Sm. – China (S.W. Guangxi)
 Phyllanthus guillauminii Däniker – New Caledonia (Tiébaghi Mts.)
 Phyllanthus gunnii Hook.f. – E. & S.E. Australia
 Phyllanthus gypsicola McVaugh – Mexico (Baja California Sur, Colima, Jalisco)

H

 Phyllanthus hainanensis Merr. – Hainan
 Phyllanthus hakgalensis Thwaites ex Trimen – Sri Lanka
 Phyllanthus hamelinii I.Telford & R.L.Barrett – N.W. Western Australia
 Phyllanthus harmandii Beille – E. Thailand to Cambodia
 Phyllanthus harrimanii G.L.Webster – Mexico (Tamaulipas)
 Phyllanthus harrisii Radcl.-Sm. – Kenya, Tanzania (incl. Zanzibar)
 Phyllanthus hasskarlianus Müll.Arg. – Jawa
 Phyllanthus helenae M.Schmid – Central New Caledonia
 Phyllanthus helferi Müll.Arg. – S. Myanmar
 Phyllanthus heliotropus C.Wright ex Griseb. – W. Cuba (incl. I. de la Juventud)
 Phyllanthus heteradenius Müll.Arg. – N.E. Brazil (to Minas Gerais)
 Phyllanthus heterodoxus Müll.Arg. – Fiji (Vanua Levu, Fulanga)
 Phyllanthus heterophyllus E.Mey. ex Müll.Arg. – KwaZulu-Natal to Cape Province
 Phyllanthus heterotrichus Lundell – Mexico (San Luis Potosí)
 Phyllanthus hexadactylus McVaugh – W. Mexico
 Phyllanthus heyneanus Müll.Arg. – S.W. India
 Phyllanthus hildebrandtii Pax – Ethiopia, N. Somalia
 Phyllanthus hirtellus F.Muell. ex Müll.Arg. – S.E. Australia
 Phyllanthus hivaoaensis (J.Florence) W.L.Wagner & Lorence – Marquesas (Hiva Oa)
 Phyllanthus hodjelensis Schweinf. – Yemen
 Phyllanthus hohenackeri Müll.Arg. – S. India
 Phyllanthus holostylus Milne-Redh. – DR Congo, Angola, Zambia
 Phyllanthus hortensis Govaerts & Radcl.-Sm. – ?
 Phyllanthus hosokawae (Fosberg) W.L.Wagner & Lorence – Caroline Islands
 Phyllanthus houailouensis M.Schmid – Central New Caledonia (Houaïlou)
 Phyllanthus huahineensis (J.Florence) W.L.Wagner & Lorence – Society Islands
 Phyllanthus huallagensis Standl. ex Croizat – Ecuador to Peru
 Phyllanthus huberi Riina & P.E.Berry – Venezuela
 Phyllanthus humbertianus Leandri – S. Madagascar
 Phyllanthus humbertii (Leandri) Petra Hoffm. & McPherson – E. Central Madagascar
 Phyllanthus humpatanus Jean F.Brunel – Angola
 Phyllanthus hutchinsonianus S.Moore – Tanzania to Mozambique
 Phyllanthus hypoleucus Müll.Arg. – Brazil (Pernambuco to Espírito Santo)
 Phyllanthus hypospodius F.Muell. – Queensland (South Kennedy)
 Phyllanthus hyssopifolioides Kunth – Dominican Rep., Trinidad, Nicaragua to S. Tropical America

I

 Phyllanthus imbricatus G.L.Webster – Cuba (S.W. I. de la Juventud)
 Phyllanthus incrustatus Urb. – N.E. Cuba
 Phyllanthus incurvus Thunb. – S. Tropical & S. Africa
 Phyllanthus indigoferoides Benth. – N. Western Australia, Northern Territory
 Phyllanthus indofischeri Bennet – India (Tamil Nadu)
 Phyllanthus inflatus Hutch. – South Sudan to Mozambique
 Phyllanthus insignis Müll.Arg. – Sumatera, Jawa, Sulawesi
 Phyllanthus insulae-japen Airy Shaw – W. New Guinea
 Phyllanthus insulanus (Müll.Arg.) Müll.Arg. – Maluku
 Phyllanthus insulensis Beille – Vietnam
 Phyllanthus inusitatus (A.C.Sm.) W.L.Wagner & Lorence – Fiji (Vanua Levu: Mt. Ndelanathau)
 Phyllanthus involutus J.T.Hunter & J.J.Bruhl – S. Queensland, New South Wales
 Phyllanthus iratsiensis Leandri – S. Central Madagascar
 Phyllanthus irriguus Radcl.-Sm. – Tanzania (Songea)
 Phyllanthus isomonensis Leandri – S.E. Madagascar
 Phyllanthus itatiaiensis Brade – Brazil (Rio de Janeiro: Serra do Mantiqueira)
 Phyllanthus ivohibeus Leandri – Central & ES.E. Madagascar

J

 Phyllanthus jablonskianus Steyerm. & Luteyn – Venezuela (Sierra de la Neblina) to Brazil (Serra da Neblina)
 Phyllanthus jaegeri Jean F.Brunel & J.P.Roux – Sierra Leone
 Phyllanthus jaffrei M.Schmid – Central New Caledonia
 Phyllanthus jarawae (Chakrab. & N.P.Balakr.) Chakrab. & N.P.Balakr. – S. Andaman Islands
 Phyllanthus jauaensis Jabl. – Venezuela (Bolívar: Cerro Jaua)
 Phyllanthus jaubertii Vieill. ex Guillaumin – New Caledonia
 Phyllanthus juglandifolius Willd. Walnutleaf leafflower, Bigleaf leafflower – Tropical America
 Phyllanthus junceus Müll.Arg. – W. Cuba (incl. I. de la Juventud)

K-O

K

 Phyllanthus kaessneri Hutch. – Kenya to Zambia
 Phyllanthus kampotensis Beille – Indo-China
 Phyllanthus kanalensis Baill. – New Caledonia
 Phyllanthus kanehirae (Hosok.) W.L.Wagner & Lorence – Caroline Islands
 Phyllanthus karibibensis Jean F.Brunel – Namibia
 Phyllanthus karnaticus (Chakrab. & M.Gangop.) Chakrab. & N.P.Balakr. – India (Karnataka)
 Phyllanthus kaweesakii Pornp., Chantar. & J.Parn – N.E. Thailand, one of the only four caudiciforms/succulents in this genus.
 Phyllanthus kelleanus Jean F.Brunel – Cameroon
 Phyllanthus kerrii Airy Shaw – N. & N.E. Thailand
 Phyllanthus kerstingii Jean F.Brunel – W. Tropical Africa
 Phyllanthus keyensis Warb. – New Guinea (Kei I.)
 Phyllanthus khasicus Müll.Arg. – E. Himalaya to Thailand, Andaman Islands
 Phyllanthus kidna Challen & Petra Hoffm. – Cameroon
 Phyllanthus kinabaluicus Airy Shaw – Borneo (Sabah)
 Phyllanthus kivuensis Jean F.Brunel – E. DR Congo
 Phyllanthus klotzschianus Müll.Arg. – Guyana, E. Brazil
 Phyllanthus koghiensis Guillaumin – S.E. New Caledonia (Massif des Koghis)
 Phyllanthus koniamboensis M.Schmid – New Caledonia
 Phyllanthus korthalsii Müll.Arg. – Borneo (S.E. Kalimantan)
 Phyllanthus kostermansii Airy Shaw – W. New Guinea
 Phyllanthus kouaouaensis M.Schmid – Central New Caledonia
 Phyllanthus koumacensis Guillaumin – N.W. New Caledonia
 Phyllanthus kozhikodianus Sivar. & Manilal – Indian Subcontinent to N. Thailand

L

 Phyllanthus lacerosus Airy Shaw – N. & E. Australia
 Phyllanthus laciniatus C.B.Rob. – Philippines
 Phyllanthus lacunarius F.Muell. – Australia
 Phyllanthus lacunellus Airy Shaw – Australia
 Phyllanthus lamprophyllus Müll.Arg. – Jawa (Madura I.) to Queensland
 Phyllanthus lanceifolius Merr. – Philippines
 Phyllanthus lanceilimbus (Merr.) Merr. – S. Philippines to Queensland
 Phyllanthus lanceolarius (Roxb.) Müll.Arg. – Indian Subcontinent to S. China
 Phyllanthus lanceolatus Poir. – Mauritius
 Phyllanthus lancisepalus (Merr.) Chakrab. & N.P.Balakr. – Myanmar, Borneo
 Phyllanthus lasiogynus Müll.Arg. – Paraguay (Ypanema)
 Phyllanthus latifolius (L.) Sw. – S. Jamaica
 Phyllanthus lativenius (Croizat) Govaerts & Radcl.-Sm. – China (Guizhou)
 Phyllanthus lawii J.Graham – India
 Phyllanthus laxiflorus Benth. – Mexico (Chiapas) to El Salvador
 Phyllanthus lebrunii Robyns & Lawalrée – Rwanda, DR Congo
 Phyllanthus lediformis Jabl. – Venezuela (Amazonas: Cerro Yutajé)
 Phyllanthus leonardianus Lisowski, Malaisse & Symoens – DR Congo
 Phyllanthus leptocaulos Müll.Arg. – Brazil (Minas Gerais)
 Phyllanthus leptoclados Benth. – S. China
 Phyllanthus leptoneurus Urb. – Hispaniola
 Phyllanthus leptophyllus Müll.Arg. – Brazil (Minas Gerais)
 Phyllanthus leschenaultii Müll.Arg. – India to Assam
 Phyllanthus letestui Jean F.Brunel – Central African Rep
 Phyllanthus letouzeyanus Jean F.Brunel – Cameroon
 Phyllanthus leucanthus Pax – Gabon to Djibouti and S. Tropical Africa
 Phyllanthus leucocalyx Hutch. – Kenya to Mozambique
 Phyllanthus leucochlamys Radcl.-Sm. – Tanzania
 Phyllanthus leucogynus Müll.Arg. – Jawa
 Phyllanthus leucosepalus Jean F.Brunel – Kenya
 Phyllanthus leytensis Elmer – Philippines (Leyte)
 Phyllanthus lichenisilvae (Leandri ex Humbert) Petra Hoffm. & McPherson – Central Madagascar (Tsaratanana)
 Phyllanthus liebmannianus Müll.Arg. – Florida, Mexico to Central America
 Phyllanthus liesneri G.L.Webster – N.W. Venezuela
 Phyllanthus ligustrifolius S.Moore – New Caledonia
 Phyllanthus lii Govaerts & Radcl.-Sm. – China (Guangxi)
 Phyllanthus limmuensis Cufod. – South Sudan to S.W. Ethiopia
 Phyllanthus lindbergii Müll.Arg. – S. Tropical America
 Phyllanthus lindenianus Baill. – Cuba to Hispaniola
 Phyllanthus lingulatus Beille – Indo-China
 Phyllanthus littoralis (Blume) Müll.Arg. – S.W. India to Malesia
 Phyllanthus liukiuensis Matsum. ex Hayata – Nansei-shoto (Manzamo-jima, Okinawa-jima)
 Phyllanthus loandensis Welw. ex Müll.Arg. – Central & E. Tropical & S. Africa
 Phyllanthus lobocarpus Benth. – Papua New Guinea to CE. Queensland
 Phyllanthus lokohensis Leandri – N.E. & ENE. Madagascar
 Phyllanthus longfieldiae Ridl. – Tubuai Islands
 Phyllanthus longipedicellatus M.J.Silva – Brazil (Bahia)
 Phyllanthus longiramosus Guillaumin – New Caledonia (Dumbéa-Païta Reg.)
 Phyllanthus longistylus Jabl. – S. Venezuela
 Phyllanthus loranthoides Baill. – New Caledonia
 Phyllanthus lucidus (Blume) Müll.Arg. – Malesia to W. New Guinea
 Phyllanthus luciliae M.Schmid – New Caledonia (Cap Bocage)
 Phyllanthus lunifolius Gilbert & Thulin – Central Somalia
 Phyllanthus lutescens (Blume) Müll.Arg. – S. China to Malesia

M

 Phyllanthus macgregorii C.B.Rob. – Philippines
 Phyllanthus macphersonii M.Schmid – New Caledonia (Ouaco)
 Phyllanthus macraei Müll.Arg. – S.W. India
 Phyllanthus macranthus Pax – Tanzania to Angola
 Phyllanthus macrocalyx Müll.Arg. – S.W. India
 Phyllanthus macrochorion Baill. – N.W. New Caledonia
 Phyllanthus macrophyllus (Labill.) Müll.Arg. – New Caledonia
 Phyllanthus macrosepalus (Hosok.) W.L.Wagner & Lorence – Caroline Islands
 Phyllanthus madagascariensis Müll.Arg. – S. Central & E. Madagascar
 Phyllanthus madeirensis Croizat – N. Brazil, W. Bolivia
 Phyllanthus maderaspatensis L. – Africa, W. Indian Ocean, Arabian Peninsula, Pakistan to Australia – canoe weed
 Phyllanthus maestrensis Urb. – Cuba (Sierra Maestra)
 Phyllanthus mafingensis Radcl.-Sm. – Malawi (Mafinga Mts.)
 Phyllanthus magdemeanus Jean F.Brunel – Cameroon
 Phyllanthus magnificens Jean F.Brunel & J.P.Roux – Ghana, Togo
 Phyllanthus maguirei Jabl. – Venezuela (Amazonas: Cerro Duida, Cerro de la Neblina)
 Phyllanthus mahengeaensis Jean F.Brunel – Tanzania
 Phyllanthus major Steyerm. – S. Venezuela to Guyana and Brazil (Roraima)
 Phyllanthus makitae Jean F.Brunel – Congo
 Phyllanthus maleolens Urb. & Ekman – Hispaniola
 Phyllanthus mananarensis Leandri – S. Madagascar
 Phyllanthus manausensis W.A.Rodrigues – N. Brazil
 Phyllanthus mandjeliaensis M.Schmid – N.W. New Caledonia
 Phyllanthus mangenotii M.Schmid – Central New Caledonia (Monéo reg.)
 Phyllanthus manicaensis Jean F.Brunel ex Radcl.-Sm. – Mozambique
 Phyllanthus mannianus Müll.Arg. – W. Tropical Africa to Cameroon
 Phyllanthus manono (Baill. ex Müll.Arg.) Müll.Arg. – Society Islands
 Phyllanthus mantadiensis Ralim. & Petra Hoffm. – Madagascar
 Phyllanthus marchionicus (F.Br.) W.L.Wagner & Lorence – Marquesas
 Phyllanthus margaretae M.Schmid – Central New Caledonia (Mt. Aoupinié)
 Phyllanthus mariannensis W.L.Wagner & Lorence – Marianas
 Phyllanthus marianus Müll.Arg. – Marianas
 Phyllanthus maritimus J.J.Sm. – W. New Guinea
 Phyllanthus marojejiensis (Leandri) Petra Hoffm. & McPherson – Central Madagascar (Marojejy Mts.)
 Phyllanthus martii Müll.Arg. – Brazil (Amazonas)
 Phyllanthus martini Radcl.-Sm. – Zambia
 Phyllanthus matitanensis Leandri – N. & E. Madagascar
 Phyllanthus mckenziei Fosberg – Aldabra
 Phyllanthus mcvaughii G.L.Webster – Mexico (Chiapas) to El Salvador
 Phyllanthus megacarpus (Gamble) Kumari & Chandrab. – S.W. India
 Phyllanthus megalanthus C.B.Rob. – Philippines
 Phyllanthus megapodus G.L.Webster – Dominica, Martinique
 Phyllanthus meghalayensis Chakrab. & N.P.Balakr. – Nepal to Thailand and Nansei-shoto
 Phyllanthus melleri Müll.Arg. – Central Madagascar
 Phyllanthus melvilleorum (Airy Shaw) W.L.Wagner & Lorence – Fiji (Viti Levu)
 Phyllanthus memaoyaensis M.Schmid – Central New Caledonia
 Phyllanthus mendesii Jean F.Brunel – Namibia to Zimbabwe
 Phyllanthus mendoncae Jean F.Brunel – Ethiopia to Mozambique
 Phyllanthus meridensis G.L.Webster – Venezuela (Mérida)
 Phyllanthus merinthopodus Diels – New Guinea
 Phyllanthus meuieensis M.Schmid – New Caledonia (Mé Ouié)
 Phyllanthus meyerianus Müll.Arg. – S. Africa
 Phyllanthus mickelii McVaugh – Mexico (Jalisco, Colima)
 Phyllanthus micranthus A.Rich. – S.E. Cuba
 Phyllanthus microcarpus (Benth.) Müll.Arg. – S.E. China to W. Malesia
 Phyllanthus microcladus Müll.Arg. – E. Queensland to E. New South Wales
 Phyllanthus microdendron Müll.Arg. – Angola, Zambia
 Phyllanthus microdictyus Urb. – N.E. Cuba
 Phyllanthus micromeris Radcl.-Sm. – Tanzania to Malawi
 Phyllanthus microphyllinus Müll.Arg. – Angola
 Phyllanthus microphyllus Kunth – Venezuela to Brazil and E. Bolivia
 Phyllanthus mieschii Jean F.Brunel & J.P.Roux – Congo, DR Congo
 Phyllanthus millei Standl. – Ecuador
 Phyllanthus mimicus G.L.Webster – Trinidad-Tobago
 Phyllanthus mimosoides Sw. – Lesser Antilles to Trinidad
 Phyllanthus minahassae Koord. – Sulawesi
 Phyllanthus minarum Standl. & Steyerm. – Guatemala
 Phyllanthus mindorensis C.B.Rob. – Philippines (Mindoro), Sulawesi
 Phyllanthus mindouliensis Jean F.Brunel – Congo
 Phyllanthus minutifolius Jabl. – Venezuela (Amazonas: Cerro Sipapo)
 Phyllanthus minutulus Müll.Arg. – Colombia to Guyana and Brazil
 Phyllanthus mirabilis Müll.Arg. – Indo-China – one of the four succulents, and one of the only two described.
 Phyllanthus mirificus G.L.Webster – N.E. Cuba
 Phyllanthus mitchellii Benth. – Queensland (Leichhardt)
 Phyllanthus mittenianus Hutch. – Kenya (Teita), Tanzania (Uluguru Mts.)
 Phyllanthus mkurirae Jean F.Brunel – Tanzania
 Phyllanthus mocinoanus Baill. – Mexico to W. El Salvador
 Phyllanthus mocotensis G.L.Webster – Brazil (Rio de Janeiro)
 Phyllanthus moeroensis De Wild. – DR Congo
 Phyllanthus moi P.T.Li – China (W. Guangxi)
 Phyllanthus mollis (Blume) Müll.Arg. – Borneo (Sabah), Philippines, Sulawesi, Maluku, Tenimber Islands, Jawa to Lesser Sunda Is
 Phyllanthus monroviae Jean F.Brunel – Liberia
 Phyllanthus montanus (Sw.) Sw. – Jamaica
 Phyllanthus montis-fontium M.Schmid – S.E. New Caledonia
 Phyllanthus montrouzieri Guillaumin – N.W. & W. Central New Caledonia
 Phyllanthus mooneyi M.G.Gilbert – Ethiopia
 Phyllanthus moonii (Thwaites) Müll.Arg. – Sri Lanka
 Phyllanthus moorei M.Schmid – New Caledonia
 Phyllanthus moramangicus (Leandri) Leandri – E. Central Madagascar
 Phyllanthus moratii M.Schmid – N.W. New Caledonia (Tiwaka-Amoa Reg.)
 Phyllanthus mouensis M.Schmid – S.E. New Caledonia
 Phyllanthus mozambicensis Gand. – Mozambique (Delagoa Bay)
 Phyllanthus muellerianus (Kuntze) Exell – Tropical Africa
 Phyllanthus mukerjeeanus D.Mitra & Bennet – India
 Phyllanthus multiflorus Poir. – N. & W. Madagascar
 Phyllanthus multilobus (A.C.Sm.) W.L.Wagner & Lorence – Fiji (Vanua Levu)
 Phyllanthus multilocularis (Roxb. ex Willd.) Müll.Arg. – India to N. Myanmar, Nepal to China (Yunnan)
 Phyllanthus muriculatus J.J.Sm. – Jawa
 Phyllanthus muscosus Ridl. – Peninsula Malaysia
 Phyllanthus mutisianus G.L.Webster – Colombia
 Phyllanthus myrianthus Müll.Arg. – Vanuatu
 Phyllanthus myriophyllus Urb. – S. Haiti
 Phyllanthus myrsinites Kunth – S. Tropical America
 Phyllanthus myrtaceus Sond. – Zimbabwe to S. Africa
 Phyllanthus myrtifolius (Wight) Müll.Arg. – S.W. India, Sri Lanka – mousetail plant
 Phyllanthus myrtilloides Griseb. – E. Cuba

N

 Phyllanthus nadeaudii (J.Florence) W.L.Wagner & Lorence – Society Islands
 Phyllanthus nanellus P.T.Li – Hainan
 Phyllanthus narayanswamii Gamble – S. India
 Phyllanthus natoensis M.Schmid – New Caledonia (Ponérihouen Reg.)
 Phyllanthus ndikinimekianus Jean F.Brunel – Cameroon
 Phyllanthus neblinae Jabl. – S. Venezuela (Sierra de la Neblina) to Brazil (Serra da Neblina)
 Phyllanthus nemoralis (Thwaites) Müll.Arg. – Sri Lanka
 Phyllanthus neoleonensis Croizat – Mexico (Coahuila, Nuevo León)
 Phyllanthus nhatrangensis Beille – S. Vietnam
 Phyllanthus nigericus Brenan – Nigeria, Bioko
 Phyllanthus nigrescens (Blanco) Müll.Arg. – Philippines
 Phyllanthus niinamii Hayata – Taiwan
 Phyllanthus ningaensis M.Schmid – New Caledonia (Mt. Ninga)
 Phyllanthus niruri L. – Tropical & Subtrop. America – gale of the wind, guinine weed, seed underleaf, stone-breaker
 Phyllanthus niruroides Müll.Arg. – W. Tropical Africa to W. Ethiopia and Angola
 Phyllanthus nitens M.Schmid – New Caledonia (Massif du Boulinda)
 Phyllanthus nitidulus Müll.Arg. – Jawa
 Phyllanthus nothisii M.Schmid – W. Central New Caledonia
 Phyllanthus novae-hollandiae Müll.Arg. – Papua New Guinea to Queensland
 Phyllanthus nozeranianus Jean F.Brunel & J.P.Roux – Ivory Coast
 Phyllanthus nubigenus (Hook.f.) Chakrab. & N.P.Balakr. – Nepal to N. Thailand
 Phyllanthus nummulariifolius Poir. – Africa
 Phyllanthus nummularioides Müll.Arg. – W. Dominican Rep
 Phyllanthus nutans Sw. – Caribbean
 Phyllanthus nyale Petra Hoffm. & Cheek – Cameroon
 Phyllanthus nyikae Radcl.-Sm. – Malawi

O

 Phyllanthus oaxacanus Brandegee – Mexico (Puebla, Oaxaca)
 Phyllanthus obdeltophyllus Leandri – S.E. Madagascar
 Phyllanthus obfalcatus Lasser & Maguire – S. Venezuela
 Phyllanthus oblanceolatus J.T.Hunter & J.J.Bruhl – Central & E. Central Australia
 Phyllanthus oblatus (Hook.f.) Chakrab. & N.P.Balakr. – Sikkim to China (Yunnan)
 Phyllanthus oblongiglans M.G.Gilbert – Ethiopia
 Phyllanthus obscurus Roxb. ex Willd. – Indo-China to W. & Central Malesia
 Phyllanthus obtusatus (Thunb.) Müll.Arg. – Brazil (Minas Gerais)
 Phyllanthus occidentalis J.T.Hunter & J.J.Bruhl – S.E. Queensland, E. New South Wales
 Phyllanthus octomerus Müll.Arg. – Brazil (Bahia)
 Phyllanthus odontadenioides Jean F.Brunel – Tanzania
 Phyllanthus odontadenius Müll.Arg. – Tropical Africa
 Phyllanthus oligospermus Hayata – S. Nansei-shoto to Taiwan
 Phyllanthus oligotrichus Müll.Arg. – Jawa
 Phyllanthus omahakensis Dinter & Pax – S. Tropical Africa to Namibia
 Phyllanthus oppositifolius Baill. ex Müll.Arg. – Mauritius
 Phyllanthus orbicularifolius (P.T.Li) Govaerts & Radcl.-Sm. – China (Guangxi)
 Phyllanthus orbicularis Kunth – Cuba to Puerto Rico
 Phyllanthus orbiculatus Rich. – Trinidad to S. Tropical America
 Phyllanthus oreichtitus Leandri – Central Madagascar
 Phyllanthus oreophilus Müll.Arg. – Sri Lanka
 Phyllanthus orientalis (Craib) Airy Shaw – N.W. Thailand
 Phyllanthus orinocensis Steyerm. – Venezuela (Amazonas: Cerro Duida)
 Phyllanthus ornatus (Kurz ex Teijsm. & Binn.) Müll.Arg. – Sumatera
 Phyllanthus orohenensis (J.W.Moore) W.L.Wagner & Lorence – Society Islands
 Phyllanthus otobedii W.L.Wagner & Lorence – Caroline Islands
 Phyllanthus ouveanus Däniker – New Caledonia (îs. Loyauté)
 Phyllanthus ovalifolius Forssk. – Tropical Africa, S.W. Arabian Peninsula
 Phyllanthus ovatifolius J.J.Sm. – Maluku (Kep. Kei)
 Phyllanthus ovatus Poir. – Guadeloupe, Martinique, St. Lucia
 Phyllanthus oxycarpus Müll.Arg. – Sumatera
 Phyllanthus oxycoccifolius Hutch. – Tanzania, Angola
 Phyllanthus oxyphyllus Miq. – Myanmar to Sumatera

P-U

P

 Phyllanthus pachyphyllus Müll.Arg. – Hainan, Indo-China to Singapore, Borneo
 Phyllanthus pachystylus Urb. – E. Cuba to N.W. Haiti
 Phyllanthus pacificus Müll.Arg. – Marquesas
 Phyllanthus pacoensis Thin – Vietnam
 Phyllanthus paezensis Jabl. – Colombia (Vichada), Venezuela (Bolívar)
 Phyllanthus palauensis Hosok. – Caroline Islands
 Phyllanthus panayensis Merr. – Philippines
 Phyllanthus pancherianus Baill. – New Caledonia
 Phyllanthus papenooensis (J.Florence) W.L.Wagner & Lorence – Society Islands
 Phyllanthus papuanus Gage – New Guinea
 Phyllanthus paraguayensis Parodi – Paraguay
 Phyllanthus parainduratus M.Schmid – E. Central & W. Central New Caledonia
 Phyllanthus parangoyensis M.Schmid – New Caledonia (Canala)
 Phyllanthus paraqueensis Jabl. – Venezuela (Amazonas: Cerro Sipapo)
 Phyllanthus parvifolius Buch.-Ham. ex D.Don – N. Pakistan to S. China
 Phyllanthus parvulus Sond. – DR Congo to S. Africa
 Phyllanthus parvus Hutch. – W. & S. Tanzania to S. Tropical Africa
 Phyllanthus paucitepalus M.Schmid – New Caledonia (Col de Mô)
 Phyllanthus pavonianus Baill. – S. Ecuador to N.W. Peru
 Phyllanthus paxianus Dinter – DR Congo, Angolia, Namibia
 Phyllanthus paxii Hutch. – DR Congo, Burundi, Tanzania, Mozambique, Malawi, Zambia, Angola
 Phyllanthus pectinatus Hook.f. – Peninsula Malaysia
 Phyllanthus peltatus Guillaumin – N.W. New Caledonia
 Phyllanthus pendulus Roxb. – Bangladesh
 Phyllanthus peninsularis Brandegee – W. Mexico
 Phyllanthus pentandrus Schumach. & Thonn. – Tropical & S. Africa
 Phyllanthus pentaphyllus C.Wright ex Griseb. – S. Florida, Caribbean to Venezuela
 Phyllanthus pergracilis Gillespie – Fiji (Viti Levu)
 Phyllanthus perpusillus Baill. – Brazil (Minas Gerais, Santa Catarina)
 Phyllanthus perrieri (Leandri) Petra Hoffm. & McPherson – Central Madagascar
 Phyllanthus pervilleanus (Baill.) Müll.Arg. – Seychelles, Comoros, N. Madagascar
 Phyllanthus petaloideus Paul G.Wilson – Mexico (México State)
 Phyllanthus petchikaraensis M.Schmid – New Caledonia (Col de Petchikara)
 Phyllanthus petelotii Croizat – Vietnam
 Phyllanthus petenensis Lundell – Guatemala
 Phyllanthus petraeus A.Chev. & Beille – W. Tropical Africa to Chad
 Phyllanthus philippioides Leandri – Central Madagascar
 Phyllanthus phillyreifolius Poir. – Mascarenes
 Phyllanthus phlebocarpus Urb. – N.E. Cuba
 Phyllanthus phuquocensis Beille – Cambodia to Vietnam
 Phyllanthus physocarpus Müll.Arg. – W. Central Tropical Africa to Kenya and KwaZulu-Natal
 Phyllanthus pierlotii Jean F.Brunel – Togo
 Phyllanthus pileostigma Coode – Mauritius
 Phyllanthus pilifer M.Schmid – New Caledonia
 Phyllanthus pilosus (Lour.) Müll.Arg. – Vietnam
 Phyllanthus pindaiensis M.Schmid – W. Central New Caledonia (Népoui Peninsula)
 Phyllanthus pinifolius Baill. – S.E. Brazil (to Paraná)
 Phyllanthus pinjenensis M.Schmid – N.W. New Caledonia (near Koné)
 Phyllanthus pinnatus (Wight) G.L.Webster – Kenya to Northern Province
 Phyllanthus piranii G.L.Webster – Brazil (Espírito Santo)
 Phyllanthus pireyi Beille – Vietnam
 Phyllanthus pitcairnensis (F.Br.) W.L.Wagner & Lorence – Pitcairn Islands
 Phyllanthus platycalyx Müll.Arg. – New Caledonia
 Phyllanthus podocarpus Müll.Arg. – Fiji (?)
 Phyllanthus poeppigianus (Müll.Arg.) Müll.Arg. – Brazil (Amazonas), Peru (Loreto), N.E. Bolivia
 Phyllanthus pohlianus Müll.Arg. – Brazil (Minas Gerais)
 Phyllanthus poilanei Beille – S. Vietnam
 Phyllanthus poliborealis Airy Shaw – W. New Guinea
 Phyllanthus polygonoides Nutt. ex Spreng. – S.W. Missouri to S.E. New Mexico & N. Mexico – smartweed leafflower
 Phyllanthus polygynus M.Schmid – N.W. New Caledonia
 Phyllanthus polyphyllus Willd. – S. India, Sri Lanka
 Phyllanthus polyspermus Schumach. – Tropical & S. Africa
 Phyllanthus pomiferus Hook.f. – S. Myanmar
 Phyllanthus ponapensis (Hosok.) W.L.Wagner & Lorence – Caroline Islands
 Phyllanthus popayanensis Pax – Colombia
 Phyllanthus poueboensis M.Schmid – N.W. New Caledonia (Pouébo Reg.)
 Phyllanthus poumensis Guillaumin – N.W. New Caledonia
 Phyllanthus praelongipes Airy Shaw & G.L.Webster – Papua New Guinea to Queensland
 Phyllanthus praetervisus Müll.Arg. – E. Himalaya to Myanmar
 Phyllanthus prainianus Collett & Hemsl. – Myanmar
 Phyllanthus procerus C.Wright – Cuba (incl. I. de la Juventud)
 Phyllanthus proctoris G.L.Webster – W. Jamaica
 Phyllanthus profusus N.E.Br. – Guinea to Congo
 Phyllanthus prominulatus J.T.Hunter & J.J.Bruhl – Northern Territory
 Phyllanthus pronyensis Guillaumin – S.E. New Caledonia
 Phyllanthus prostratus Müll.Arg. – Angola, Zimbabwe
 Phyllanthus pseudocarunculatus Radcl.-Sm. – S. DR Congo, Zambia
 Phyllanthus pseudocicca Griseb. – E. Cuba
 Phyllanthus pseudoguyanensis Herter & Mansf. – Uruguay
 Phyllanthus pseudoniruri Müll.Arg. – Cameroon to Somalia and Botswana
 Phyllanthus pseudoparvifolius R.L.Mitra & Sanjappa – Bhutan to Assam (Meghalaya)
 Phyllanthus pseudotrichopodus M.Schmid – E. Central New Caledonia (Houaïlou to Touho)
 Phyllanthus pterocladus S.Moore – N.W. New Caledonia
 Phyllanthus puberus (L.) Müll.Arg. – China, Taiwan, Japan (Kyushu)
 Phyllanthus pulcher Wall. ex Müll.Arg. – China (Yunnan, Guangxi) to W. Malesia – tropical leafflower
 Phyllanthus pulcherrimus Herter ex Arechav. – Uruguay
 Phyllanthus pulchroides Beille – Indo-China
 Phyllanthus pullenii Airy Shaw & G.L.Webster – New Guinea
 Phyllanthus pulverulentus Urb. – S.E. Cuba
 Phyllanthus pumilus (Blanco) Müll.Arg. – Philippines
 Phyllanthus puncticulatus Jean F.Brunel – Ethiopia
 Phyllanthus puntii G.L.Webster – Brazil (Acre), W. Bolivia
 Phyllanthus purpureus Müll.Arg. – Angola, Namibia
 Phyllanthus purpusii Brandegee – Mexico (Oaxaca, Chiapas)
 Phyllanthus pycnophyllus Müll.Arg. – S. Venezuela to Guyana

Q–R

 Phyllanthus quintuplinervis M.Schmid – S. Central New Caledonia
 Phyllanthus racemigerus Müll.Arg. – Venezuela
 Phyllanthus raiateaensis W.L.Wagner & Lorence – Society Islands
 Phyllanthus raivavensis (F.Br.) W.L.Wagner & Lorence – Tubuai Islands
 Phyllanthus ramillosus Müll.Arg. – S. Brazil to N. Argentina
 Phyllanthus ramosii Quisumb. & Merr. – Philippines
 Phyllanthus ramosus Vell. – S.E. Brazil
 Phyllanthus rangachariarii Murugan, Kabeer & G.V.S.Murthy – India (Tamil Nadu)
 Phyllanthus rangoloakensis Leandri – E. Central & S.E. Madagascar
 Phyllanthus rapaensis (J.Florence) W.L.Wagner & Lorence – Tubuai Islands
 Phyllanthus raynalii Jean F.Brunel & J.P.Roux – Cameroon
 Phyllanthus reinwardtii Müll.Arg. – Jawa
 Phyllanthus reticulatus Poir. – Tropical & Subtrop. Asia to N. Australia – kajibajiba, potatobush
 Phyllanthus retinervis Hutch. – Tanzania to Zambia
 Phyllanthus retroflexus Brade – Brazil (Bahia, Espírito Santo)
 Phyllanthus revaughanii Coode – Mozambique Channel Islands
 Phyllanthus rhabdocarpus Müll.Arg. – Jawa
 Phyllanthus rheedei Wight – E. Himalaya to Sri Lanka
 Phyllanthus rheophilus Airy Shaw – Papua New Guinea
 Phyllanthus rheophyticus M.G.Gilbert & P.T.Li – Hainan
 Phyllanthus rhizomatosus Radcl.-Sm. – Tanzania (Morogoro)
 Phyllanthus rhodocladus S.Moore – New Caledonia (E. Ignambi)
 Phyllanthus ridleyanus Airy Shaw – S. Thailand to Peninsula Malaysia
 Phyllanthus riedelianus Müll.Arg. – S.E. & S. Brazil
 Phyllanthus rivae Pax – DR Congo, Ethiopia
 Phyllanthus robinsonii Merr. – Philippines
 Phyllanthus robustus Mart. ex Colla – Brazil (Rio de Janeiro)
 Phyllanthus roseus (Craib & Hutch.) Beille – China (Yunnan) to Peninsula Malaysia
 Phyllanthus rosmarinifolius Müll.Arg. – Brazil (Rio de Janeiro: Serra dos Órgãos)
 Phyllanthus rosselensis Airy Shaw & G.L.Webster – New Guinea (Louisiade Arch.)
 Phyllanthus rotundifolius J.G.Klein ex Willd. – Cape Verde, Tropical Africa, Arabian Peninsula, Pakistan to Sri Lanka
 Phyllanthus rouxii Jean F.Brunel – Ghana, Togo
 Phyllanthus rozennae M.Schmid – New Caledonia (S. I. Art)
 Phyllanthus ruber (Lour.) Spreng. – Hainan, Vietnam
 Phyllanthus ruber (Blume) T.Kuros. – Tropical & Subtrop. Asia
 Phyllanthus rubescens Beille – Indo-China
 Phyllanthus rubicundus Beille – Vietnam
 Phyllanthus rubriflorus J.J.Sm. – New Guinea
 Phyllanthus rubristipulus Govaerts & Radcl.-Sm. – Vietnam
 Phyllanthus rufuschaneyi Welzen, R.W.Bouman & Ent - Sabah
 Phyllanthus rufoglaucus Müll.Arg. – Jawa
 Phyllanthus rupestris Kunth – Colombia to N. Brazil
 Phyllanthus rupicola Elmer – Philippines
 Phyllanthus rupiinsularis Hosok. – Caroline Islands
 Phyllanthus ruscifolius Müll.Arg. – Colombia (Valle del Cauca)

S

 Phyllanthus saffordii Merr. – Marianas
 Phyllanthus salesiae M.J.Silva – Brazil (Minas Gerais)
 Phyllanthus salicifolius Baill. – N.W. New Caledonia
 Phyllanthus salomonis Airy Shaw – New Guinea (Louisiade Arch.) to Santa Cruz Islands
 Phyllanthus salviifolius Kunth – Costa Rica to N.W. Venezuela and Peru
 Phyllanthus samarensis Müll.Arg. – Philippines (Samar), Sulawesi
 Phyllanthus sambiranensis Leandri – Madagascar
 Phyllanthus samoanus (Müll.Arg.) W.L.Wagner & Lorence – Samoa, Niue
 Phyllanthus sanjappae Chakrab. & M.Gangop. – Andaman Islands
 Phyllanthus sarasinii Guillaumin – Central New Caledonia
 Phyllanthus sarothamnoides Govaerts & Radcl.-Sm. – Brazil (Bahia: Serra da Lapa)
 Phyllanthus sauropodoides Airy Shaw – Queensland
 Phyllanthus savannicola Domin – Queensland
 Phyllanthus saxosus F.Muell. – Western Australia, South Australia
 Phyllanthus scaber Klotzsch – W. & S. Western Australia
 Phyllanthus scabrifolius Hook.f. – W. & S. India
 Phyllanthus schaulsii Jean F.Brunel – Cameroon
 Phyllanthus schliebenii Mansf. ex Radcl.-Sm. – Tanzania (Lindi)
 Phyllanthus scopulorum (Britton) Urb. – N.E. Cuba
 Phyllanthus securinegoides Merr. – Philippines
 Phyllanthus seemannii (Müll.Arg.) Müll.Arg. – Fiji
 Phyllanthus selbyi Britton & P.Wilson – Cuba (incl. I. de la Juventud)
 Phyllanthus sellowianus (Klotzsch) Müll.Arg. – S. Brazil to Paraguay
 Phyllanthus semicordatus Müll.Arg. – Jawa
 Phyllanthus senyavinianus (Glassman) W.L.Wagner & Lorence – Caroline Islands
 Phyllanthus sepialis Müll.Arg. – South Sudan to Tanzania
 Phyllanthus serandii Jean F.Brunel – Guinea
 Phyllanthus sericeus (Blume) Müll.Arg. – S. Indo-China to W. Malesia and Philippines (Palawan)
 Phyllanthus serpentinicola Radcl.-Sm. – Zimbabwe
 Phyllanthus serpentinus S.Moore – N.W. New Caledonia
 Phyllanthus sessilis Warb. – New Guinea
 Phyllanthus shabaensis Jean F.Brunel – S. DR Congo
 Phyllanthus sibuyanensis Elmer – Philippines
 Phyllanthus sieboldianus T.Kuros. – Japan (S. Honshu, Shikoku, Kyushu) to Nansei-shoto
 Phyllanthus sikkimensis Müll.Arg. – Nepal to N. Peninsula Malaysia
 Phyllanthus similis Müll.Arg. – Queensland, New South Wales
 Phyllanthus simplicicaulis Müll.Arg. – Brazil (Minas Gerais)
 Phyllanthus sincorensis G.L.Webster – Brazil (Bahia)
 Phyllanthus singalensis (Miq.) Müll.Arg. – Sumatera
 Phyllanthus singampattianus (Sebast. & A.N.Henry) Kumari & Chandrab. – S. India (Tirunelveli Distr.)
 Phyllanthus skutchii Standl. – S. Costa Rica
 Phyllanthus smithianus G.L.Webster – Fiji
 Phyllanthus societatis Müll.Arg. – S. Pacific
 Phyllanthus somalensis Hutch. – S. Somalia, N.E. Kenya
 Phyllanthus songboiensis Thin – Vietnam
 Phyllanthus sootepensis Craib – China (S. Yunnan) to N. Thailand
 Phyllanthus spartioides Pax & K.Hoffm. – Brazil (Bahia, Minas Gerais, Goiás)
 Phyllanthus sphaerogynus Müll.Arg. – E. Himalaya to S. China
 Phyllanthus spinosus Chiov. – Somalia
 Phyllanthus spirei Beille – Laos
 Phyllanthus sponiifolius Müll.Arg. – Colombia to Ecuador
 Phyllanthus spruceanus Müll.Arg. – Brazil (Amazonas)
 Phyllanthus squamifolius (Lour.) Stokes – Vietnam
 Phyllanthus st-johnii W.L.Wagner & Lorence – Society Islands
 Phyllanthus standleyi McVaugh – Mexico (Sinaloa to Michoacán)
 Phyllanthus stellatus Retz. – Sri Lanka
 Phyllanthus stenophyllus Guillaumin – New Caledonia (Poindimié-Touho)
 Phyllanthus stipitatus M.Schmid – N. Central New Caledonia (Massif du Boulinda)
 Phyllanthus stipularis Merr. – Philippines
 Phyllanthus stipulatus (Raf.) G.L.Webster – Mexico to Tropical America
 Phyllanthus striaticaulis J.T.Hunter & J.J.Bruhl – South Australia
 Phyllanthus strobilaceus Jabl. – S. Venezuela
 Phyllanthus stultitiae Airy Shaw – W. New Guinea
 Phyllanthus stylosus Griff. – Nepal to Assam
 Phyllanthus subapicalis Jabl. – S. Venezuela to Brazil (Roraima)
 Phyllanthus subcarnosus C.Wright ex Griseb. – Cuba, Haiti
 Phyllanthus subcrenulatus F.Muell. – Queensland, New South Wales
 Phyllanthus subcuneatus Greenm. – Mexico
 Phyllanthus subemarginatus Müll.Arg. – E. & S. Brazil
 Phyllanthus sublanatus Schumach. & Thonn. – W. Tropical Africa to Chad
 Phyllanthus submarginalis Airy Shaw – Lesser Sunda Islands
 Phyllanthus submollis K.Schum. & Lauterb. – New Guinea
 Phyllanthus subobscurus Müll.Arg. – Jawa
 Phyllanthus subsessilis (N.P.Balakr. & Chakr.) Chakrab. & N.P.Balakr. – Andaman Islands
 Phyllanthus suffrutescens Pax – S. Ethiopia, Somalia, Kenya, Uganda, Tanzania
 Phyllanthus sulcatus J.T.Hunter & J.J.Bruhl – Northern Territory, Queensland
 Phyllanthus superbus (Baill. ex Müll.Arg.) Müll.Arg. – Peninsula Thailand to W. Malesia
 Phyllanthus sylvincola S.Moore – S.E. New Caledonia
 Phyllanthus symphoricarpoides Kunth – Colombia to Peru

T

 Phyllanthus tabularis Airy Shaw – Papua New Guinea
 Phyllanthus tagulae Airy Shaw & G.L.Webster – New Guinea (Louisiade Arch.)
 Phyllanthus taitensis (Baill. ex Müll.Arg.) Müll.Arg. – Cook Islands, Society Is., Marquesas
 Phyllanthus talbotii Sedgw. – S.W. India (Goa, Karnataka)
 Phyllanthus tanaensis Jean F.Brunel – Kenya
 Phyllanthus tangoensis M.Schmid – New Caledonia (Plateau de Tango)
 Phyllanthus tanzanianus Jean F.Brunel – Tanzania
 Phyllanthus tanzaniensis Jean F.Brunel – Tanzania
 Phyllanthus taxodiifolius Beille – China (S. Yunnan, S.W. Guangxi) to Indo-China
 Phyllanthus taylorianus Jean F.Brunel – Cameroon to Ethiopia and Zimbabwe
 Phyllanthus temehaniensis (J.W.Moore) W.L.Wagner & Lorence – Society Islands
 Phyllanthus tenellus Roxb. – Tanzania to Mozambique, S.W. Arabian Peninsula, W. Indian Ocean – Mascarene island leafflower
 Phyllanthus tener Radcl.-Sm. – Zambia
 Phyllanthus tenuicaulis Müll.Arg. – E. Cuba, Haiti
 Phyllanthus tenuipedicellatus M.Schmid – New Caledonia
 Phyllanthus tenuipes C.B.Rob. – Philippines
 Phyllanthus tenuirhachis J.J.Sm. – Sulawesi to W. New Guinea
 Phyllanthus tenuis Radcl.-Sm. – Zambia
 Phyllanthus tepuicola Steyerm. – Venezuela (Amazonas: Cerro Duida)
 Phyllanthus tequilensis B.L.Rob. & Greenm. – Mexico
 Phyllanthus tessmannii Hutch. – São Tomé, Equatorial Guinea
 Phyllanthus tetrandrus Roxb. – Assam to Bangladesh
 Phyllanthus thaii Thin – Vietnam
 Phyllanthus thomsonii Müll.Arg. – S.E. Tibet to Bangladesh
 Phyllanthus thulinii Radcl.-Sm. – Tanzania (Morogoro)
 Phyllanthus tiebaghiensis M.Schmid – N.W. New Caledonia (Massif de la Tiébaghi)
 Phyllanthus tireliae M.Schmid – New Caledonia (Massif du Boulinda)
 Phyllanthus tixieri M.Schmid – New Caledonia (Kouaoua Reg.)
 Phyllanthus torrentium Müll.Arg. – New Caledonia
 Phyllanthus touranensis Beille – Vietnam
 Phyllanthus triandrus (Blanco) Müll.Arg. – N. & Central Philippines
 Phyllanthus trichogynus (Müll.Arg.) Müll.Arg. – Philippines
 Phyllanthus trichopodus Guillaumin – New Caledonia (Touho Reg.)
 Phyllanthus trichosporus Adelb. – Jawa, Sulawesi
 Phyllanthus trichotepalus Brenan – South Sudan to Burundi
 Phyllanthus triphlebius C.B.Rob. – Philippines
 Phyllanthus tritepalus M.Schmid – E. Central New Caledonia (Canala)
 Phyllanthus trungii Thin – Vietnam
 Phyllanthus tsarongensis W.W.Sm. – Tibet, China (Sichuan, Yunnan)
 Phyllanthus tsetserrae Jean F.Brunel – Mozambique
 Phyllanthus tuamotuensis (J.Florence) W.L.Wagner & Lorence – Tuamotu (Niau, Taravai)
 Phyllanthus tuerckheimii G.L.Webster – Mexico (Oaxaca, Chiapas) to Guatemala
 Phyllanthus tukuyuanus Jean F.Brunel – Tanzania

U

 Phyllanthus udoricola Radcl.-Sm. – Malawi, Zambia, Zimbabwe
 Phyllanthus ukagurensis Radcl.-Sm. – N.E. Tanzania
 Phyllanthus umbratus Müll.Arg. – S.E. Brazil
 Phyllanthus umbricola Guillaumin – S.E. New Caledonia
 Phyllanthus unifoliatus M.Schmid – W. Central New Caledonia (Pindai Peninsula)
 Phyllanthus unioensis M.Schmid – S. Central New Caledonia (Table Unio)
 Phyllanthus upembaensis Jean F.Brunel – DR Congo
 Phyllanthus urbanianus Mansf. – Haiti (Massif de la Hotte)
 Phyllanthus urceolatus Baill. – Society Islands
 Phyllanthus urinaria L. – Tropical & Subtrop. Asia to N. Australia – chamberbitter, longstalked phyllanthus
 Phyllanthus ussuriensis Rupr. & Maxim. – Mongolia, Russian Far East to Japan and Taiwan
 Phyllanthus utricularis Airy Shaw & G.L.Webster – W. New Guinea

V-Z

V

 Phyllanthus vacciniifolius (Müll.Arg.) Müll.Arg. – S. Venezuela to Guyana and N. Brazil
 Phyllanthus vakinankaratrae Leandri – Central Madagascar
 Phyllanthus valerioi Standl. – Costa Rica
 Phyllanthus valleanus Croizat – Colombia
 Phyllanthus vanderystii Hutch. & De Wild. – DR Congo
 Phyllanthus varians (Miq.) Müll.Arg. – Sumatera
 Phyllanthus vatovaviensis Leandri ex Ralim. & Petra Hoffm. – E. Madagascar
 Phyllanthus veillonii M.Schmid – New Caledonia (S. I. Art)
 Phyllanthus velutinus (Wight) Müll.Arg. – Pakistan to China (Yunnan)
 Phyllanthus ventricosus G.L.Webster – Peru (Loreto)
 Phyllanthus ventuarii Jabl. – Venezuela (Amazonas: Cerro Parú)
 Phyllanthus venustulus Leandri – Central Madagascar
 Phyllanthus vergens Baill. – N. Madagascar
 Phyllanthus verrucicaulis Airy Shaw – New Guinea to Bismarck Arch
 Phyllanthus vespertilio Baill. – New Caledonia (Canala, Col d'Amos)
 Phyllanthus vichadensis Croizat – Colombia
 Phyllanthus villosus Poir. – S. China
 Phyllanthus vincentae J.F.Macbr. – Peru (Loreto)
 Phyllanthus virgatus G.Forst. – Tropical & Subtrop. Asia to S.W. Pacific
 Phyllanthus virgulatus Müll.Arg. – DR Congo, Angola, Zambia, Malawi
 Phyllanthus virgultiramus Däniker – N.W. New Caledonia (Masssif du Koniambo)
 Phyllanthus viridis M.E.Jones – Mexico (Baja California)
 Phyllanthus vitiensis Müll.Arg. – Fiji
 Phyllanthus vitilevuensis W.L.Wagner & Lorence – Fiji (Viti Levu)
 Phyllanthus volkensii Engl. – Kenya to Tanzania
 Phyllanthus vulcani Guillaumin – E. Central & S.E. New Caledonia

W

 Phyllanthus wallichianus (Müll.Arg.) Müll.Arg. – Peninsula Thailand to W. Malesia
 Phyllanthus warburgii K.Schum. – New Guinea
 Phyllanthus warnockii G.L.Webster – S.W. & Central U.S. to N.E. Mexico – sand reverchonia
 Phyllanthus watsonii Airy Shaw – Peninsula Malaysia
 Phyllanthus websteri (Fosberg) W.L.Wagner & Lorence – Caroline Islands
 Phyllanthus websterianus Steyerm. – Brazil (Goiás)
 Phyllanthus welwitschianus Müll.Arg. – Tropical Africa, Indo-China
 Phyllanthus wheeleri G.L.Webster – Sri Lanka
 Phyllanthus wightianus Müll.Arg. – S.W. India
 Phyllanthus wilderi (J.Florence) W.L.Wagner & Lorence – Tuamotu (Mangareva, Makatea)
 Phyllanthus wilkesianus Müll.Arg. – Fiji (Viti Levu, Vanua Levu)
 Phyllanthus williamioides Griseb. – E. Cuba (Sierra Sagua Baracoa)
 Phyllanthus wingfieldii Radcl.-Sm. – E. Tanzania
 Phyllanthus wittei Robyns & Lawalrée – DR Congo to Burundi
 Phyllanthus womersleyi Airy Shaw & G.L.Webster – Papua New Guinea
 Phyllanthus wrightii (Benth.) Müll.Arg. – S. China to Hainan

X–Z

 Phyllanthus xerocarpus O.Schwarz – N. Borneo to Northern Territory
 Phyllanthus xiphophorus Jean F.Brunel – N. Zambia
 Phyllanthus xylorrhizus Thulin – N.E. Somalia
 Phyllanthus yangambiensis Jean F.Brunel – DR Congo
 Phyllanthus yaouhensis Schltr. – New Caledonia (Nouméa)
 Phyllanthus youngii Jean F.Brunel – Angola
 Phyllanthus yunnanensis (Croizat) Govaerts & Radcl.-Sm. – China (Guizhou, Yunnan)
 Phyllanthus yvettae M.Schmid – E. Central & S.E. New Caledonia
 Phyllanthus zambicus Radcl.-Sm. – Zambia
 Phyllanthus zanthoxyloides Steyerm. – Venezuela (Monagas)
 Phyllanthus zippelianus Müll.Arg. – Lesser Sunda Islands
 Phyllanthus zornioides Radcl.-Sm. – Malawi, Zambia, Zimbabwe

References

External links

List
Phyllanthus